Nobukazu Takemura (竹村延和 Takemura Nobukazu) is a Japanese musician and artist. Born in Hirakata, Osaka in August 1968, he became interested in music at a young age by listening to the radio, and began to make music at home with a tape recorder and keyboard. During high school, after a record store job that exposed him to jazz and hip-hop, he had regular gigs in the clubs of Osaka and Kyoto as a battle DJ before launching his music career. Takemura's music career has seen him cover a wide range of genres and styles within short periods of time. Beginning his career in hip-hop and jazz, Takemura later entered into a prolific period  as an electronic musician, exploring genres such as glitch, drum and bass and minimalism. Takemura's most recent work has included chamber music and performance art.

Career
In 1990, Takemura founded the instrumental hip hop group Audio Sports with Yamatsuka Eye (of The Boredoms) and Aki Onda. Their first album, Era of Glittering Gas, was released in 1992 (after which Onda subsequently took control of the project).

In 1992, Takemura formed the nu-jazz collective Spiritual Vibes, which released several albums and a few singles throughout the early to mid-1990s.  During this period Takemura would occasionally toy with (and eventually pursue full-time in the late 1990s) his own solo releases, typically under the names of DJ Takemura or Kool Jazz Productions. He has released music under the pseudonyms of DJ Takemura, Child's View and Assembler, and his music has covered a wide variety of genres in a short amount of time, ranging from hip-hop instrumentals, to jazz, to chamber music and electronic minimalism, breakbeat, noise pop, glitch and jungle music.  The vast majority of Takemura's music has been recorded in his home-made "Moonlit Studio", in his Kyoto apartment.  
 
He founded the Lollop and Childisc labels in the 1990s after meeting musicians who were unable to release their music due to not having a record label.  His voluminous releases, remixes, and collaborations make a comprehensive discography difficult, and his music often defies any easy categorization. Takemura's first U.S. release was Funfair on the Bubble Core label in 1998, a slightly altered release of the Yoru No Yuenchi album released previously in Japan. This was followed by Scope on the Thrill Jockey label in 1999, an album that was released solely in the U.S. He has frequently collaborated with fellow Childisc vocalist/composer Aki Tsuyuko, with her vocals having been sampled on many of his albums.

His unique and complex approach to melody and instrumentation has generated a catalog of collaborations with critically acclaimed artists including Issey Miyake, Zu, Steve Reich, DJ Spooky, Yo La Tengo, Tortoise, and Tujiko Noriko.  Takemura performed live extensively in the early 2000s, having toured the U.S. opening for Tortoise and Plaid, as well as touring the U.K. with a full live band playing his music on a sponsorship from the British Arts Council.
Takemura was also responsible for the sound design of Sony's robotic dog AIBO.

Takemura moved from his long-term home of Kyoto to Berlin, Germany in 2008. In February 2014, Takemura released Zeitraum, a compilation of music, sounds and images he had created from 2004 – 2013 for various projects, commissions and collaborations.  Zeitraum is Takemura's first solo album release in 11 years.

Discography
Note:  This discography only includes solo and collaboration releases under the names of "Nobukazu Takemura", "Child's View", "Assembler" or "DJ Takemura".  None of Takemura's group releases, such as with Audio Sports or Spiritual Vibes, are included.

Studio albums

Extended plays

Singles

Collaborative albums

References

External links
http://www.discogs.com/artist/1777-Nobukazu-Takemura
http://www.discogs.com/artist/8313-Childs-View
http://www.discogs.com/artist/118267-Assembler
http://musicbrainz.org/artist/e60957f9-56fd-49f1-823f-e8d15f2b0eec

External links
 Official Web Page (under construction)

Japanese electronic musicians
Intelligent dance musicians
People from Hirakata
People from Kyoto
Japanese expatriates in Germany
1968 births
Living people